Beta is a time signal service in the VLF range in Russia, operated by the Russian Navy. It is controlled by All-Russian Scientific Research Institute for Physical-Engineering and Radiotechnical Metrology. There are 6 transmitter stations, which take turns transmitting time signals and other communications.

Each transmitter has 1 or 2 scheduled sessions per day lasting 31–41 minutes, depending on transmitter, total 8 sessions in 24 hours. Beginning on the hour is 15–20 minutes of 25.0 kHz, including morse code station identification and time code.  This is followed by 3- or 4-minute intervals of 25.1, 25.5, 23.0 and 20.5 kHz of unmodulated carrier precisely phase-locked to UTC(SU) time scale.  No time code is sent during the last quarter of an hour.

The Beta network 
Beta consists of the following transmitters:

Frequency usage 
The time code consists of a series of signals on multiple frequencies.  Transmission starts on the hour.  Each time a new frequency is selected, there is 1 minute of low power while the transmitter is adjusted, then full-power transmissions begin.

The transmitters are estimated to operate at 1000 kW, achieving 30–50 kW EIRP.  (The difference is due to the low efficiency of antennas at this frequency, which must be much smaller than the 12 km wavelength.)

The time code consists of a series of carrier pulses:
 Each 100 ms, a 25 ms burst of carrier is transmitted
 Each second, a 100 ms burst of carrier is transmitted
 Each 10 s, a 1 s burst of carrier is transmitted
 Each minute, a 10 s burst of carrier is transmitted
The hour or date is not coded.

Most of the stations were built in the 1970s.  RJH63 and RAB99, built later, has a different transmission:

See also
 RWM

References

Further reading

 VLF radio networks information
 The Russian VLF time-signal stations, “Beta”, by Trond Jacobsen, with detailed transmission format information.

Time signal radio stations
Science and technology in the Soviet Union
Communications in the Soviet Union
Soviet Navy
Russian Navy